KOND (107.5 FM, "La Jefa 107.5") is a commercial radio station that is licensed to Hanford, California, United States and serves the Fresno area. The station is owned by Latino Media Network; under a local marketing agreement, it is programmed by former owner TelevisaUnivision's Uforia Audio Network. KOND broadcasts a Regional Mexican format.

History

Early years
The station at 107.5 FM first signed on in September 1976 as KKYS. It was owned by Kings Broadcasters and broadcast a middle of the road music format. In October 1983, Kings sold KKYS and its AM sister station KNGS to Sunrise Communications for $1.75 million. The new owner changed the FM station's call sign to KLTK the following year.
In August 1986, Sunrise sold the combo to Liggett Broadcasting Group for $2.8 million; at the time, KLTK aired a contemporary hit radio format. Liggett then flipped the FM outlet to classic rock (then known as "classic hits", a term now referring to a broad-based format featuring 1970s—1990s music). The call letters became KCLQ on October 27, later adjusted to KCLQ-FM in September 1987 when KNGS took on the KCLQ call sign.

In early 1990, the station became the first FM affiliate of ABC Radio's Z Rock network, airing a syndicated format featuring hard rock and heavy metal music. KCLQ-FM changed its call letters to KZRZ shortly after the flip. This new call sign prompted a restraining order from the similarly named KRZR, a competing rock station. KZRZ subsequently chose the KFRZ call sign; however, that selection triggered threats of legal action from another station, KFRE. The Z Rock affiliate settled on KZZF.

On April 1, 1991, KZZF dropped Z Rock in favor of adult contemporary, adopting new call letters KMMA on April 22. Six months later, in October 1991, the station became KCML, a country music outlet branded "Camel Country".

In June 1992, Liggett Broadcasting sold KCML to Pappas Telecasting, owner of KMPH-TV in Visalia, for $550,000. The new owner installed a news/talk format the following year, using reporters from its TV sister station; new call letters KMPH-FM followed on February 22, 1993. In April 2005, KMPH-FM flipped to rhythmic adult contemporary as KVBE, "Vibe 107.5".

Univision/Uforia era (2005–present)
In October 2005, Pappas Telecasting Cos. sold KVBE to Univision Radio for $10 million. Univision began programming the station immediately via a time brokerage agreement and changed its call letters to KRDA on January 31, 2006.

On August 2, 2016, KRDA exchanged frequencies with KOND, sending the Spanish adult hits format to 92.1 FM. The station at 107.5 FM became KOND, a regional Mexican outlet branded "La Jefa 107.5".

KOND was one of eighteen radio stations that TelevisaUnivision sold to Latino Media Network in a $60 million deal announced in June 2022, approved by the Federal Communications Commission (FCC) that November, and completed in January 2023. Under the terms of the deal, Univision agreed to continue programming the station for up to one year under a local marketing agreement.

References

External links

OND
Univision Radio Network stations
OND
Radio stations established in 1976
1976 establishments in California
Regional Mexican radio stations in the United States